Vũ Giáng Hương (Bac Ninh, 23 January 1930–20 August 2011) was a Vietnamese woman painter. She was well known for her graceful silk paintings. She graduated from the Vietnam College of Fine Arts in 1960. From 1989 to 1994 she was general secretary of Vietnam's Arts Association.

Her parents were the writer Vũ Ngọc Phan and the poet Hằng Phương.

References

1930 births
2011 deaths
Vietnamese painters